Ain Erreggada is a town in Berkane Province, Oriental, Morocco. At the time of the 2004 census it had a population of 2,983.

It is the historic capital of the Jarawa tribe.

References

Populated places in Berkane Province
Municipalities of Morocco